The Switzerland women's national rugby union team are a national sporting side of Switzerland, representing them at rugby union.

History 
Although Switzerland was a regular entrant in the European sevens tournaments from 2003, it was not until 2009 that they formed a fifteens team. In 2011, after two years playing only against club sides from neighbouring countries, Switzerland became the 56th international test match playing team when they played Belgium at Kituro Rugby Club, Schaerbeek, near Brussels.

The team for the first test match was:

Atkinson, Bauer, Buob, Casparis, Da Silva, Diener, Hart, Haymoz, Herrmann, Hodel, Huerlimann, Kehl, Kehrli, Mancini, Martinot, Mc Namara, Munstermann, Oriwall, Reischauer (C), Sax, Ullmann, Walti.

Coaches: Muehlhofer, Prébandier.

Results summary

(Full internationals only)

References

External links
Fédération Suisse de Rugby - Official Site
Official swiss XV's women's national rugby union team
Official Swiss Women's Rugby facebook page

Women's national rugby union teams